Alim Mohaze Moundi (born 3 February 1995) is a Cameroonian professional footballer who plays for Finnish club Peimari United, as a midfielder.

Career
Moundi spent his early career with Aigle Royal Menoua. After playing with FC Ilves, on 5 December 2018 Moundi signed with TPS from the 2019 season. He spent the 2022 season with Peimari United.

References

1995 births
Living people
Cameroonian footballers
Aigle Royal Menoua players
FC Ilves players
Turun Palloseura footballers
Veikkausliiga players
Ykkönen players
Association football midfielders
Cameroonian expatriate footballers
Cameroonian expatriate sportspeople in Finland
Expatriate footballers in Finland